Daniel Njenga Muturi (born 7 May 1976) is a Kenyan long-distance runner, who specializes in the marathon.

He had his first successes in 1995 as he won the steeplechase gold medal at the 1995 Summer Universiade and also the Chiba International Cross Country meeting. He was based in Japan from early on in his early career and won the steeplechase at the Japanese Championships on three occasions.

Njenga turned to marathon running and made his debut in 1995 at the Saitama Marathon in Ageo, Saitama, Japan, placing first, and then coming in tenth in his second marathon at the 1999 Fukuoka Marathon. His breakthrough year came in 2002 when he was the runner-up at the Beppu-Oita Marathon and Chicago Marathon. His time of 2:06:16 hours in Chicago made him the third fastest runner in the world for 2002, behind only Khalid Khannouchi and Paul Tergat. He is known for his consistent, close finishes in the Chicago Marathon, finishing as runner-up three times and third on two occasions, between 2003 and 2007. He was the 2006 winner of the Sendai Half Marathon. He won the Tokyo International Marathon in 2004 and then the reformed Tokyo Marathon in 2007. Njenga is a featured subject in the 2007 marathon documentary Spirit of the Marathon.

Njenga was victorious at the 2009 Hokkaido Marathon and took consecutive runner-up spots at the Beppu-Ōita Marathon in 2010 and 2011.

Achievements

Notes
Daniel Njenga should not be confused with a similarly named Kenyan athlete, Daniel Mburu Njenga, who was the winner of the 2008 Toronto Marathon and 2009 Mississauga Half Marathon.

References

External links

1976 births
Living people
Kenyan male long-distance runners
Kenyan male marathon runners
Kenyan male steeplechase runners
Tokyo Marathon male winners
Universiade medalists in athletics (track and field)
Universiade gold medalists for Kenya
Medalists at the 1995 Summer Universiade
Japan Championships in Athletics winners